The Schaumburg Boomers are a professional baseball team based in Schaumburg, Illinois, that began play in the independent Frontier League in 2012. The team plays its home games at Wintrust Field. The Boomers replaced the now defunct Schaumburg Flyers of the Northern League after the franchise was evicted for not paying almost US$1 million in back rent.

The "Boomers" nickname comes from a common nickname for males of the greater prairie chicken species, a bird which was once abundant in the Midwest but is now a vulnerable species.  That bird's nickname comes from the dance these males do in order to attract females for mating purposes. The Boomers carry on the mascot's tradition by performing a reenactment of the prairie chicken's dance in between innings during games.

History
Originally, the team was set to play in the American Association of Independent Professional Baseball under the ownership of Joliet Slammers principal owner Alan Oremus; however, Oremus sold the team to Gary SouthShore RailCats owner Pat Salvi, who moved the team to the Frontier League because of his loyalty to the RailCats and lack of interest in setting up a conflict should the two teams play against each other.  Under Oremus's ownership, the team had held a name-the-team contest, with the winning selection of "Mallers".  After the ownership change, however, the Boomers name, logo, and colors were unveiled on October 18, 2011.

The first signed roster player was infielder Andrew Cohn of Emory University.  Shortstop Gerard Hall recorded the first hit in Boomers history in a 4–0 shutout against the Lake Erie Crushers in Avon, Ohio, in the franchise's first-ever regular season game. Outfielder Jereme Milons had the first extra-base hit in team history with a double to centerfield in the same game.

The Boomers won their home debut with a 5–2 victory over the Florence Freedom in front of 6,067 fans at Boomers Stadium. Outfielder Nate Baumann hit the first home run at Boomers Stadium with a two-run blast to left in the five-run sixth inning.

The Boomers finished the first half of their inaugural season as the Frontier League West Division Leaders with a record of 29–19. The team had a total of 10 representatives appear in the 2012 Frontier League All-Star Game in Normal. Manager Jamie Bennett managed the West Division squad and was joined by his coaching staff, Mike Kashirsky, Paul Kubon, C.J. Thieleke, and team trainer Scott Waehler. Schaumburg's Frank Pfister was selected as the West Division's starting third baseman, and was joined by outfielders Sean Mahley and Chad Mozingo and pitchers Cameron Roth and Patrick Mincey.

The Schaumburg Boomers won the 2013 Frontier League championship in September 2013, becoming the first team in league history to finish the playoffs undefeated (in this case 6–0 as they won two best-of-five series). They defeated the Lake Erie Crushers in the championship final.

The Boomers again won the 2014 Frontier League championship, winning back-to-back titles. They beat the Southern Illinois Miners 2 games to 1 in the divisional round, and beat the River City Rascals 3 games to 1 to win the title.

The Boomers also won the 2017 Frontier League championship by defeating the Evansville Otters in the first round 3 games to 1, and beat the Florence Freedom, also 3 games to 1, in the championship round to win the title.

The Boomers won their fourth title by winning the 2021 Frontier League championship as they beat the Florence Y'alls in the first round 3 games to 1, and defeating the Washington Wild Things 3 games to 2 in the championship round.

Season-by-season records

Radio
Games are broadcast on WRMN (1410 AM, Elgin, Illinois) by Boomers broadcaster Tim Calderwood.

Mascot

The mascot of the Schaumburg Boomers is Coop the boomer.  Coop is portrayed by a person dressed in a prairie chicken costume.

Current Roster

Notable alumni
 Justin Erasmus (2014)
 Jake Cousins (2019)
 Willy García (2021)
 Braxton Davidson (2021–2022)

References

External links
 

2011 establishments in Illinois
Baseball teams in Chicago
Frontier League teams
Professional baseball teams in Illinois
Schaumburg, Illinois
Baseball teams established in 2011